Francine Valerie McNiff (24 March 1948 - 2 April 2015) was a legal scholar, and was the first female state magistrate in Victoria, Australia. She was appointed Children's Court Stipendary Magistrate in August 1983 after working a senior legal officer within the Victorian public service.

In November 2013, the University of Melbourne created the Francine V McNiff Chair in Human Rights Law, in recognition of her contributions to the field.

She is the author or co-author of a number of books including Guide to children's courts practice in Victoria and Criminal liability for Australian computer abuse in the early 1980s.

References

Victorian lawyers
1948 births
2015 deaths